The 16th Street station was a station on the demolished section of the BMT Fifth Avenue Line in Brooklyn, New York City. It was served by trains of the BMT Culver Line and BMT Fifth Avenue Line and had 2 tracks and 1 island platform. The station was built on August 15, 1889, at the intersection of Fifth Avenue and 16th Street, and had a connection to the 15th Street Line trolleys. The next stop to the north was Ninth Street. The next stop to the south was 20th Street. It closed on May 31, 1940.

References

BMT Fifth Avenue Line stations
Former elevated and subway stations in Brooklyn
Railway stations in the United States opened in 1889
Railway stations closed in 1940
1889 establishments in New York (state)
1940 disestablishments in New York (state)